Tutli-ye Olya (also Romanized as Tūtlī-ye ‘Olyā; also known as Tūtlī-ye Bālā) is a village in Jargalan Rural District, Raz and Jargalan District, Bojnord County, North Khorasan Province, Iran. At the 2006 census, its population was 652, in 127 families.

References 

Populated places in Bojnord County